Route 2 is a  major east–west state highway in Massachusetts. Along with Route 9 and U.S. Route 20 to the south, these highways are the main alternatives to the Massachusetts Turnpike/I-90 toll highway. Route 2 runs the entire length of the northern tier of Massachusetts, beginning at the New York border, where it connects with New York State Route 2, and ending near Boston Common in Boston.  Most of the route is a freeway through the northern tier of Massachusetts, with the longest non-limited access segments being the western portion (the Mohawk Trail).  Older alignments of Route 2 are known as Route 2A.

Route description

Route 2 proceeds east from the New York state line on a winding, scenic path in Berkshire County through Williamstown, where it serves the Williams College area, and through North Adams, where it serves the Massachusetts College of Liberal Arts. East of North Adams, Route 2 ascends via a hairpin turn into the Hoosac Range along what is known as the Mohawk Trail.

Route 2 then enters Franklin County, meeting Interstate 91 at an interchange in Greenfield and briefly runs concurrently with I-91. While the old Route 2 becomes Route 2A and goes through downtown Greenfield, Route 2 exits off I-91 as a short expressway before becoming a two-lane freeway. Outside Greenfield, Route 2A temporarily ends and merges with Route 2. Route 2 remains a regular two-lane surface road in Gill and through Erving, though it has some grade-separated interchanges in Millers Falls at its intersection with Route 63. There is another gap in the two-lane expressway in the Erving area. Recently, the road in Erving was routed to the north and straightened to avoid the paper mill next to the river. This rerouting led to the road being shortened by less than a tenth of a mile.

Once the road enters the Town of Orange, Route 2A resumes and diverges from Route 2. At this point, Route 2 again becomes a two-lane expressway. In Orange, Route 2 runs concurrently with U.S. Route 202. The road at this point enters the town of Athol in Worcester County. After its eastern interchange in Phillipston when US-202 departs to the north, Route 2 becomes a full four-lane expressway, though not to Interstate standards at most points. It continues through Gardner into Fitchburg where Route 2 has several at-grade intersections with Oak Hill Rd, Palmer Rd, Mt. Elam Rd and Abbott Ave. At the intersection with Mt. Elam Rd, a traffic light remains in use on the eastbound side. Continuing east into Leominster, Interstate 190 splits off, heading south to Worcester.

Route 2 continues east to Middlesex County and enters Boston's outer loop at the interchange with Interstate 495 in Littleton. It continues into Acton, where Route 2 reduces its speed to 45 miles per hour, and becomes a four-lane arterial road with some at-grade intersections. At the Concord Rotary, a major traffic choke point, Route 2 intersects with Route 2A and the eastern terminus of Route 119 (which is concurrent with Route 2A). After the rotary, the road loses its dividing wall as it passes by the State Police (who have an emergency-only traffic light) and over the Assabet River. Route 2A formerly broke away from Route 2 at the next traffic light to go left into Concord but is now overlaid with Route 2. At Crosby's Corner, the sixth intersection after the rotary, Route 2A exits under the highway while Route 2 veers right (but still heads east). While the highway is divided across Lincoln, there is a single traffic light intersection at Bedford Road.

At this point, Route 2 enters Lexington and still is a divided four-lane road with surface intersections. It then heads to Boston's inner belt, and as it crosses Interstate 95/Route 128, it becomes a six lane controlled access highway with a speed limit of 55 miles per hour. In Belmont, Route 2 remains a six-lane highway, and then becomes an eight-lane controlled-access highway at Exit 132 (formerly 57) in Arlington, where U.S. Route 3 would have joined it from the north. At Exit 135 (formerly 60), the freeway narrows width to six lanes. The section of expressway from Route 128 to the Cambridge line meets the standards of an interstate highway. As the highway enters Cambridge, the highway reduces its speed limit back to 45 miles per hour and becomes a five lane limited access highway (three lanes heading east, two lanes heading west), with a strip of residential and transit-oriented development on its eastbound side, including an off-ramp that serves the MBTA Alewife Station, Cambridge Discovery Park and development to the south and west of the station. After the Alewife exit, the highway narrows again to four lanes.

The highway then meets a large at-grade intersection with Routes 3 and 16, where Route 2 east merges with U.S. Route 3 south and Route 16 and continues as a four-lane, 35 mile per hour arterial parkway — managed by the Department of Conservation and Recreation — for the rest of its time in Cambridge. Route 2 follows Alewife Brook Parkway and Fresh Pond Parkway along its wrong way concurrency with Routes 3 and 16, before Route 16 heads west into Watertown. Route 2 and Route 3 concurrently start paralleling the Charles River as Memorial Drive, passing by Harvard University’s campus. It then heads southward on the Boston University Bridge into Boston proper, as it separates from Route 3. It winds through the Boston University campus as Mountfort Street and crosses over both the Massachusetts Turnpike and Commonwealth Avenue before heading due east towards Kenmore Square, while running parallel to U.S. Route 20. Immediately east of the Boston University campus, it crosses into Kenmore Square, which is also the eastern terminus of U.S. Route 20. From Kenmore Square, Route 2 follows Commonwealth Ave to Arlington St. It circles the Boston Public Garden, using Arlington, Boylston, and Charles Streets.
Route 2 east goes along northbound Route 28 north at the intersection of Charles and Beacon Streets between Boston Common and the Boston Public Garden. As Route 28 north joins Storrow Drive, which shortly after would join Route 3, Route 28 south joins Route 2 and completes the loop around Boston Public Garden.

History
The route amalgamates and supersedes various named highways in some cases going back to the pre-automobile era. For example, parts of Route 2 are sometimes known as the Cambridge and Concord Turnpike and the Mohawk Trail.

In the early 1920s, Route 2 was known as New England Interstate Route 7 (NE-7), a major road connecting Boston with Troy, New York. NE-7 ran roughly where Route 2A (the original surface alignment of Route 2) does now except near the New York state line. NE-7 used current Massachusetts Route 43, New York State Route 43 and New York State Route 66 to reach Troy. Current Route 2 from Williamstown to Petersburgh was previously numbered as Route 96.

Route 2 connected as a highway in its current right-of-way at Alewife Brook Parkway at some point before 1937.

An upgraded Route 2 was originally planned to continue as Boston's Northwest Expressway (merging with a re-routed U.S. Route 3 at the Arlington-Lexington or Arlington-Cambridge border) to a junction with Interstate 695, the Inner Beltway, but this, along with the Inner Beltway itself, was cancelled in 1970, accounting for the abrupt narrowing at Alewife.  In place of the highway project, the MBTA Red Line was extended from Harvard to Alewife in the 1980s.

The Leominster to Ayer section opened on July 3, 1953, completing the expressway portion from Westminster to West Concord. Full grade separation between Route 128 and Alewife Brook Parkway was completed around 1970.

Crosby's Corner intersection

This major project has been planned since 1999. The intersection had an average of 90 accidents a year. The project was intended to solve the traffic and safety problems that had long occurred at the Crosby's Corner intersection (junction of Route 2 and 2A) in Concord. The project, which was expected to cost $71.9 million, widened Route 2 from Bedford Rd in Lincoln to 300 feet west of Sandy Pond Rd in Concord. The project eliminated the at grade intersection, realigned Route 2, and constructed new entrance and exit ramps along with new service roads next to Route 2.

The full project included building a new overpass bridge over Route 2 and building multiple service roads next to Route 2. Work also consisted of a new signalized intersection. The project was put out to bid for contractors on September 19, 2011. A contractor was expected to be chosen over the winter and construction was expected to begin in Spring 2012 on the estimated $55 million project.

The Army Corps of Engineers published a notice for this project, because of its impact on wetlands at Crosby's Corner. During the summer of 2012, activity on this portion of Route 2 included surveying and the installation of orange-painted stakes. Signs were added in January 2013 indicating that construction would start on January 14. As of April 2014 the project was underway and predicted completion was spring 2016. The project was completed in 2016, with a large improvement in traffic flow.

Future

Concord rotary
A project to improve the Concord Rotary, at the convergence of Route 2, Route 2A/119 (Elm Street), Barrett's Mill Road and Commonwealth Avenue, has been in planning since 2003 or even earlier. More than 61,000 cars use this rotary on a typical day, and the backed up traffic can be significant. The improved intersection would include overpasses for local streets, while Route 2 traffic would continue unimpeded at grade. However, the project was removed from the funded portion of the Boston Region Metropolitan Planning Organization's (MPO) Long Range Transportation Plan (LRTP) in August 2009 and is currently on hold.

Major intersections
MassDOT was scheduled to replace the old sequential exit numbers with the new milepost-based exit numbers beginning in summer 2020, which had been delayed since 2016. On March 16, 2021, MassDOT announced that the Route 2 exit numbers would get renumbered for four weeks starting on March 23.

See also
 Freeway and expressway revolts

References

External links

 Mass. Route 2 Current and Future Exit Numbers List

002
Transportation in Berkshire County, Massachusetts
Transportation in Franklin County, Massachusetts
Transportation in Middlesex County, Massachusetts
Transportation in Norfolk County, Massachusetts
Transportation in Suffolk County, Massachusetts
Transportation in Worcester County, Massachusetts
Massachusetts Route 2
Transportation in Boston